Rozaliya Haydyarovna Nasretdinova, (born 10 February 1997) is a Russian swimmer. She is of Tatar and Russian roots.

Career
In 2012, Nasretdinova competed in her first 2012 European Junior Championships taking silver in 50 m freestyle and gold in 4 × 100 m freestyle. The same year, she competed in seniors at the 2012 European Short Course Swimming Championships taking silver in 4×50 m mixed freestyle.

In 2013, Nasretdinova won 4 gold medals at the 2013 European Junior Championships, in 50 m freestyle, 50 m butterfly, 4 × 100 m freestyle and 4 × 100 m mixed freestyle. She won gold in 4×50 m mixed freestyle and bronze in 4×50 m freestyle at the 2013 European Short Course Swimming Championships. Nasretdinova (together with Svetlana Chimrova, Daria Ustinova and Yulia Efimova's) gold in 4×50 m medley at the 2013 European Short Course Championships was later disqualified due to Yulia Efimova's alleged positive test for DHEA, a prescription steroid banned in professional sports.

In 2014, Nasretdinova won 2 gold medals in swimming at the 2014 Youth Olympic Games in Nanjing, China in 50 m freestyle and 50 m butterfly. She has competed at the 2014 FINA World Swimming Championships (25 m) in Doha, Qatar taking silver in  4×50 m mixed freestyle (with Vladimir Morozov, Veronika Popova, Evgeny Sedov, Oleg Tikhobaev, Margarita Nesterova and Nikita Konovalov).

References

External links
 
 
 Rozaliya Nasretdinova at The-Sports.org

 
 

1997 births
Living people
Russian female butterfly swimmers
Russian female freestyle swimmers
Swimmers from Moscow
Olympic swimmers of Russia
Swimmers at the 2016 Summer Olympics
World Aquatics Championships medalists in swimming
European Aquatics Championships medalists in swimming
Swimmers at the 2014 Summer Youth Olympics
Medalists at the FINA World Swimming Championships (25 m)
Universiade medalists in swimming
Tatar people of Russia
Universiade gold medalists for Russia
Universiade bronze medalists for Russia
Youth Olympic gold medalists for Russia
Medalists at the 2015 Summer Universiade